Nahapet Gevorgyan (born June 28, 1957) was born in the village of Hoktember in the Hoktemberyan region in Armenia. 

On May 25, 2003 he was elected again to the NA from electoral district 30, and he serves on the NA Standing Committee on Defense, National Security and Internal Affairs. He is also a member of the Republican Party of Armenia Faction.

External links 
Former Armavir Marzpet and MP suspected of murdering Head of Nalbandyan village
Gevorgyan at Parliament.am

Living people
1957 births
Republican Party of Armenia politicians